Erta is the women's World Cup giant slalom ski course on Piz de Plaies mountain in Kronplatz, Italy, debuted in 2017.

World Cup 
Full results at FIS website.

Women

References

External links
FIS Alpine Ski World Cup – Kronplatz, Italy 
Ski-db.com - Kronplatz women's races

Skiing in Italy
Ski slopes